Gonophaea is a monotypic moth genus of the family Noctuidae erected by George Hampson in 1910. Its only species, Gonophaea villica, was first described by Schaus in 1904. It is found in the Brazilian state of São Paulo.

References

Acontiinae
Monotypic moth genera